The 1990 season was the Washington Redskins' 59th in the National Football League, their 54th representing Washington, D.C. and the tenth under head coach Joe Gibbs.  The team matched on their 10–6 record from 1989, this time it was enough to earn them' their first playoff appearance since 1987. The Redskins' season ended when they fell to the San Francisco 49ers 28–10 in the divisional round of the playoffs.

Offseason

NFL Draft

Roster

Regular season

Schedule

Note: Intra-division opponents are in bold text.

Standings

Playoffs

References

Washington
Washington Redskins seasons
Red